The North American Vexillological Association (NAVA) is a membership organization devoted to vexillology, the scientific and scholarly study of flags. It was founded in 1967 by American vexillologist Whitney Smith (1940–2016), and others.  Its membership of 600+ comprises flag scholars, enthusiasts, designers, collectors, conservators, educators, merchants, manufacturers, historians, and hobbyists. 

NAVA publishes Raven: A Journal of Vexillology, an annual peer-reviewed journal and Vexillum, a quarterly magazine (combining the previous Flag Research Quarterly and NAVA News).  They cover vexillological topics and inter-disciplinary discussion as well as the Association's proceedings and other vexillological news.

Its guidebook to flag design, "Good" Flag, "Bad" Flag, articulates the basic principles of vexillography and has influenced flag-design efforts across the U.S. and beyond.  It has been translated into Spanish, French, German, Italian, Portuguese, Slovenian, and Russian, and is available online.

NAVA honors achievement in the field with several honors and awards:
 Captain William Driver Award: presented to the individual who presents the best paper at the association's annual meeting
 The Vexillonnaire Award: recognizing a flag scholar who becomes personally involved in a significant and successful act of creating, changing, or improving flag design, or promoting good flag usage or altering it for the better
 Kevin Harrington Award: presented to the individual who authors the best article to appear in a non-vexillological publication during the preceding year
 John Purcell Award: presented to an individual for an exemplary contribution that promotes public understanding of vexillology in North America
 Doreen Braverman Award: presented to an organizational member who supports the association's mission by making a significant contribution to the vexillological community
 Whitney Smith Fellow: an individual who makes an outstanding contribution to North American vexillology may be elected to this honor by NAVA's executive board. An honoree is entitled to use the postnominals "WSF"
 Honorary membership: honors an individual who renders distinguished service to the association or vexillology

NAVA is the largest vexillological organization in the world and a charter member of the International Federation of Vexillological Associations.

Organization flag 
The association's flag consists of a large white "V" (an inverted chevron) separating a blue triangle above from two red triangles on either side.  The length of the top side of the blue triangle is the same as the width of the flag ("width" is the vertical dimension when flying from a flagpole). The flag proportion is 2:3.

The "V" represents vexillology.  The colors are from the flags of the two countries in the association, Canada and the United States.

Annual meetings
Since 1967, the association has held annual meetings across the United States and Canada for all those interested in flags to present and discuss research, share their passion for flags, and to honor vexillological achievement. Since 1977, it has marked each meeting with a distinctive flag.

References

External links 

 NAVA website

Clubs and societies in the United States
Clubs and societies in Canada
International Federation of Vexillological Associations
Organizations established in 1967
Heraldic societies
Semiotics organizations
Vexillological organizations